The Voyeurs is a 2021 American erotic thriller film written and directed by Michael Mohan. Shot and set in Montreal, Quebec, Canada, it stars Sydney Sweeney and Justice Smith as a young couple who spy on and become obsessed by the lives of their neighbors across the street (Ben Hardy and Natasha Liu Bordizzo). Greg Gilreath and Adam Hendricks serve as producers under their Divide/Conquer banner.

It was released on September 10, 2021, by Amazon Studios, on the Amazon Prime Video streaming service. Despite receiving mixed reviews from critics, this film's streaming performance had exceeded Amazon Studios' expectations.

Plot
A young couple, Pippa and Thomas, move into their first apartment together in Montreal. They soon realize that their windows look directly into the apartment across the street, where a man with a professional studio is taking photographs of a woman. Pippa and Thomas watch as the couple have sex. They jokingly give their neighbors pseudo names, Margot and Brent.

Pippa, who works as a trainee optometrist at L'Optique, receives a bird feeder from her boss as a housewarming gift. Pippa buys a pair of binoculars so she and Thomas can watch the couple. They often see "Brent" having sex with several models while "Margot" is out.

Pippa expresses interest in knowing what the neighbors are saying, eventually learning that Thomas knows a way to listen in on another room using a laser pointer; the process requires a reflective surface to send the laser beam back to them. When "Brent" and "Margot" throw a Halloween costume party in their apartment, Pippa and Thomas sneak in by posing as guests. Pippa plants a mirror in the apartment, later allowing her and Thomas to listen in on their conversations. They are unsettled to hear "Margot" confront "Brent" about his adultery; "Brent" assaults "Margot" and rebukes her suspicions.

The next day, "Margot", whose real name is Julia, visits L'Optique where she receives an eye exam from Pippa and orders a new set of glasses recommended by her. Julia invites Pippa to hang out. Pippa wants to warn Julia about "Brent's" adultery, but Thomas insists that she stop spying on the neighbors. Later, Pippa and Julia meet at a spa; Julia reveals that her husband is named Sebastian, or Seb, and is a well-known photographer.

Pippa observes Seb having a threesome and throwing a condom away afterwards. She later discovers how to access Julia and Seb's wireless printer, which she uses to anonymously expose Seb's infidelities to Julia, mentioning the condom as proof. Thomas angrily confronts Pippa about being so invested in Julia and Seb's lives. The next morning, Pippa apologizes to Thomas and promises to stop watching the neighbors. However, they see Seb discover Julia's body in the bathroom, after she seemingly slit her own throat. Thomas blames Pippa for Julia's death, breaks up with her, and leaves.

Although heartbroken, Pippa continues to watch Seb and one evening decides to follow him to a nearby pub. Seb sits by Pippa and they talk. He asks her to let him photograph her at his apartment, which she accepts. Seb convinces Pippa to pose nude for him, and they eventually have sex. Upon returning home, Thomas consumes part of a drink Pippa left in the refrigerator and pours the rest into her bird feeder. He notices Pippa having sex with Seb across the street. The next morning, a horrified Pippa finds Thomas dead in their apartment, having apparently hanged himself.

Pippa and her friend Ari attend Seb's exhibition, which turns out to be a collaboration with Julia, who is alive. Pippa and Thomas are revealed to be the subjects of the exhibition. Seb and Julia divulge that they own the apartment rented by Pippa and Thomas (whose lease included a clause stating that they consented to be photographed), and they knew they were being watched. Distressed, Pippa storms off. She decides to move out of the apartment, and notices dead birds on a grate just below her bird feeder.

Following an interview promoting their exhibition, Seb and Julia return home to find a congratulatory bottle of wine by their door. As they drink the wine, Pippa sends a message to their printer saying she knows they killed Thomas. After leading Seb and Julia into L'Optique, Pippa deduces that while she was having sex with Seb, Julia poisoned Thomas's drink and staged his suicide. Pippa also reveals that she spiked their wine, causing Julia and Seb to faint. Pippa places the two under a LASIK machine, using it to burn their corneas.

A new couple have moved into Pippa and Thomas's former apartment. They observe Seb and Julia in their apartment, both of whom are now blind. Pippa watches Seb and Julia from the rooftop, before leaving her binoculars behind.

Cast

 Sydney Sweeney as Pippa
 Justice Smith as Thomas
 Ben Hardy as Sebastian 
 Natasha Liu Bordizzo as Julia
 Katharine King So as Ari
 Cameo Adele as Joni
 Jean Yoon as Dr. Sato

Production
In September 2019, it was announced Michael Mohan would direct the film from a screenplay he wrote, with Greg Gilreath and Adam Hendricks serving as producers under their Divide/Conquer banner, and Amazon Studios distributing. In November 2019, Sydney Sweeney, Justice Smith, Natasha Liu Bordizzo and Ben Hardy joined the cast of the film.

Principal photography began in October 2019 in Montreal, Canada.

Release
The Voyeurs was released on September 10, 2021, on the Amazon Prime Video streaming service. This film's streaming performance had exceeded Amazon Studios' expectations.

Critical response
The film received mixed reviews from critics, who compared it unfavorably to its forebears in the voyeuristic thriller genre, such as Rear Window (1954) and Body Double (1984). On Rotten Tomatoes, The Voyeurs holds a 43% approval rating based on 35 reviews, with an average rating of 5.8/10. On Metacritic, the film has a weighted average score of 54 out of 100, based on 9 critics, indicating "mixed or average reviews".

In a negative review for the Chicago Sun-Times, Richard Roeper described The Voyeurs as a "salacious and wildly implausible story that holds our interest for a while before flying off the cliff and into an abyss of creepy, ludicrous and ultimately ridiculous twists and turns". Nick Schager of Variety was also critical of the film, which he found "plays like rehashed leftovers cooked up for young viewers who've never seen any of its superior inspirations", such as Hitchcock's Rear Window (1954). In the San Francisco Chronicle, G. Allen Johnson felt Michael Mohan's script was "pedestrian" and unfavorably compared his direction to that of David Lynch and Brian De Palma. "One suspects they would have a bit more fun and taken us further down the moral rabbit hole," Johnson explained, "And the sex would have been better too."

On the other hand, Charles Bramesco was more appreciative of The Voyeurs. In a four-out-of-five star review for The Guardian, he found the film to be "the real deal, an ideal cocktail of funny, diabolical and perverted," and a timely update of Rear Window. "At last, a homage that dares to ask," Bramesco quipped, "what if Grace Kelly had been able to give the wheelchair-bound Jimmy Stewart a hand job the first time they both looked in on his neighbors across the way?"

References

External links
 

2021 films
2021 thriller films
2020s American films
2020s English-language films
2020s erotic thriller films
Amazon Prime Video original films
Amazon Studios films
American erotic thriller films
Films about adultery in the United States
Films about photographers
Films directed by Michael Mohan
Films set in apartment buildings
Films set in Montreal
Films shot in Montreal